Receiver autonomous integrity monitoring (RAIM) is a technology developed to assess the integrity of global positioning system (GPS) signals in a GPS receiver system. It is of special importance in safety-critical GPS applications, such as in aviation or marine navigation.

GPS does not include any internal information about the integrity of its signals. It is possible for a GPS satellite to broadcast slightly incorrect information that will cause navigation information to be incorrect, but there is no way for the receiver to determine this using the standard techniques. RAIM uses redundant signals to produce several GPS position fixes and compare them, and a statistical function determines whether or not a fault can be associated with any of the signals. RAIM is considered available if 24 GPS satellites or more are operative. If the number of GPS satellites is 23 or fewer, RAIM availability must be checked using approved ground-based prediction software.

Several GPS-related systems also provide integrity signals separate from GPS. Among these is the WAAS system, which uses separate signals broadcast from different satellites to indicate these problems directly.

General description
RAIM detects faults with redundant GPS pseudorange measurements. That is, when more satellites are available than needed to produce a position fix, the extra pseudoranges should all be consistent with the computed position. A pseudorange that differs significantly from the expected value (i.e., an outlier) may indicate a fault of the associated satellite or another signal integrity problem (e.g., ionospheric dispersion).  Traditional RAIM uses fault detection (FD) only, however newer GPS receivers incorporate fault detection and exclusion (FDE) which enables them to continue to operate in the presence of a GPS failure.

The test statistic used is a function of the pseudorange measurement residual (the difference between the expected measurement and the observed measurement) and the amount of redundancy.  The test statistic is compared with a threshold value, which is determined based on the required probability of false alarm (Pfa).

RAIM
Receiver autonomous integrity monitoring (RAIM) provides integrity monitoring of GPS for aviation applications. In order for a GPS receiver to perform RAIM or fault detection (FD) function, a minimum of five visible satellites with satisfactory geometry must be visible to it. RAIM has various kinds of implementations; one of them performs consistency checks between all position solutions obtained with various subsets of the visible satellites. The receiver provides an alert to the pilot if the consistency checks fail.

RAIM availability is an important issue when using such kind of algorithm in safety-critical applications (such as the aeronautical ones); in fact, because of geometry and satellite service maintenance, RAIM is not always available at all, meaning that the receiver's antenna could have sometimes fewer than five satellites in view.

Availability is also a performance indicator of the RAIM algorithm.  Availability is a function of the geometry of the constellation which is in view and of other environmental conditions. If availability is seen in this way it is clear that it is not an on–off feature meaning that the algorithm could be available but not with the required performance of detecting a failure when it happens. So availability is a performance factor of the algorithm and characterizes each one of the different kinds of RAIM algorithms and methodologies.

Fault detection and exclusion
An enhanced version of RAIM employed in some receivers is known as fault detection and exclusion (FDE). It uses a minimum of six measurements which can be achieved with 6 satellites or 5 satellites with baro-aiding to not only detect a possible faulty satellite, but to exclude it from the navigation solution so the navigation function can continue without interruption. The goal of fault detection is to detect the presence of a positioning failure. Upon detection, proper fault exclusion determines and excludes the source of the failure (without necessarily identifying the individual source causing the problem), thereby allowing GNSS navigation to continue without interruption. The availability of RAIM and FDE will be slightly lower for mid-latitude operations and slightly higher for equatorial and high-latitude regions due to the nature of the orbits.  The use of satellites from multiple GNSS constellations or the use of SBAS satellites as additional ranging sources can improve the availability of RAIM and FDE.

RAIM prediction
GNSS differs from traditional navigation systems because the satellites and areas of degraded coverage are in constant motion. Therefore, if a satellite fails or is taken out of service for maintenance, it is not immediately clear which areas of the airspace will be affected, if any. The location and duration of these outages can be predicted with the aid of computer analysis and reported to pilots during the pre-flight planning process. This prediction process is, however, not fully representative of all RAIM implementations in the different models of receivers. Prediction tools are usually conservative and thus predict lower availability than that actually encountered in flight to provide protection for the lowest end receiver models.

Because RAIM operates autonomously, that is without the assistance of external signals, it requires redundant pseudorange measurements. To obtain a 3D position solution, at least four measurements are required. To detect a fault, at least 5 measurements are required, and to isolate and exclude a fault, at least six measurements are required, however often more measurements are needed depending on the satellite geometry. Typically there are seven to 12 satellites in view.

The test statistic used is a function of the pseudorange measurement residual (the difference between the expected measurement and the observed measurement) and the amount of redundancy. The test statistic is compared with a threshold value, which is determined based on the requirements for the probability of false alarm (Pfa) and the expected measurement noise.  In aviation systems, the Pfa is fixed at 1/15000.

The horizontal integrity limit (HIL) or horizontal protection level (HPL) is a figure which represents the radius of a circle which is centered on the GPS position solution and is guaranteed to contain the true position of the receiver to within the specifications of the RAIM scheme (i.e. which meets the Pfa and Pmd).  The HPL is calculated as a function of the RAIM threshold and the satellite geometry at the time of the measurements.  The HPL is compared with the horizontal alarm limit (HAL) to determine if RAIM is available.

RAIM prediction websites
To enable pilots to quickly determine whether en route or approach level RAIM will be available, the FAA and EUROCONTROL have created "dispatch level" websites that predict RAIM status to meet pre-flight check requirements.
The FAA's RAIM prediction website "AC 90–100" covers US territories in graphical map format (showing green for RAIM available and red for RAIM not available)
EUROCONTROL provides international coverage for most waypoints in the worldwide aviation waypoint database and displays results in a "timeline" bar showing predictions of whether baro-aided or non-baro-aided RAIM will be available.
EUROCONTROL puts a disclaimer on its data (stating that USCG data takes precedence), whereas the FAA certifies its website as meeting regulatory requirements.
As of 1 July 2012 AUGUR coverage has been limited to ECAC airspace only.
Since 2006, the N-RAIM Prediction Service, hosted by NAVBLUE, offers worldwide coverage for all PBN applications including RNP 10, RNAV 5, RNAV 2, RNAV 1, RNP 4, RNP 1, RNP Approach and RNP AR Approach down to 0.1NM. The online tool is an alternative to the automated service integrated directly into flight planning software. It is kept up-to-date in line with new editions of the ICAO PBN Manual and any worldwide specific regulation.
The SPACEKEYS RAIM prediction and avoidance system developed and hosted by FLIGHTKEYS offers worldwide coverage for any type of RAIM prediction and covers all integrity levels from RNP10 (Enroute) to RNP Approach and RNP AR Approach (down to 0.1NM). The online tool allows RAIM predictions for locations and full trajectories (routes) as well as area based RAIM predictions. REST and SOAP APIs are also available for 3rd party system integrations.

External links
 ADS-B & RAIM PREDICTION: FAA ADS-B and AC90-100A GPS RAIM Service Availability Prediction Tool (SAPT).
 Worldwide Coverage from the FAA.
 AUGUR: the Eurocontrol GPS RAIM prediction tool.
 N-RAIM: the NAVBLUE prediction tool.
 GPSEasysuite II KaI Borre Aalborg University paper.
 SPACEKEYS RAIM Prediction And Avoidance: SPACEKEYS RAIM prediction and avoidance system (developed by FLIGHTKEYS).

Avionics
Aircraft instruments
Air navigation
Global Positioning System